Kawana may refer to:

People
Kawana (surname)
kāwana, Māori-language term for the Governor-General of New Zealand

Places
Kawana, Iran
Electoral district of Kawana
Kawana Waters, Queensland
Kawana, Queensland (Rockhampton)

See also
 Kawana Station (disambiguation)